Eternium may refer to:
Eternium (video game), a 2012 RPG game developed by Dream Primer and published by Making Fun Inc.
Eternium (album), a 2004 album by the band Diablo
A fictional planet in the Futurama series first seen in the episode "The Day the Earth Stood Stupid"
A metal from the role-playing game Ancient Domains of Mystery
A metal from the role-playing game World of Warcraft expansion pack The Burning Crusade
A metal from the planet Eternia in the television series He-Man and the Masters of the Universe
A mineral from Black Adam (film)